Jim Hill may refer to:

 Jim Hill (racing driver) (1890–?), American racecar driver
 Jim Hill (broadcaster) (born 1946), American sportscaster and former NFL player
 Jim Hill (Oregon politician) (born 1947), attorney, financial consultant, and politician from the U.S. state of Oregon
 Jim Hill (Alabama politician) (born 1950), member of the Alabama House of Representatives
 Jim Hill (Hillsboro politician), member of the Oregon House of Representatives from Hillsboro
 Jim Hill (athlete), American cross-country runner, competed in 1979 IAAF World Cross Country Championships
 Jim Hill (writer) (active 1986), British television writer for The Bill
 Homeland Security Agent Jim Hill, fictional character in the television series 24, portrayed by Carl Edwards

See also 
 James Hill (disambiguation)
 Jim Hill High School, public high school located in Jackson, Mississippi
 Jim Hill Mountain, a peak in Chiwaukum Mountains, Washington
 Jim Hilles (born 1936), American football player and coach
 Jimmy Hill (disambiguation)
 Hill (surname)